The Super Eight stage of the 2007 Cricket World Cup was scheduled between 27 March 2007 and 21 April 2007, and determined the four qualifiers for the semi-finals of the tournament. Matches were held in Antigua, Bridgetown in Barbados, Georgetown in Guyana, and Grenada.

Each team carried forward the result from the other team qualifying from its group in the group stage of the tournament, so the Super Eight was essentially an eight-team round robin competition. Two points were awarded for a win and one for a tie or a no result. If teams were tied on points, the team with the most wins was ranked ahead, and if this is also equal net run rate determined the ranking order.

Table
The four top teams, depicted with green backgrounds in the table below, qualified for the semi-finals.

Teams
Eight teams qualified from the group stage. India and Pakistan, ranked fifth and fourth in the ICC ODI Championship before the tournament began, were eliminated by Bangladesh and Ireland respectively. The other six seeded teams proceeded, with Australia beating the number one ranked team in the One Day International championship, South Africa. New Zealand, Sri Lanka and West Indies also carried one win forward from the group stage.

ICC ODI Championship rankings
These were the rankings as of 12 March, before the group stage began.

Note:Ireland did not have an official ODI ranking; they were ranked in this tournament based on their win percentage against associate members and then wins against full members.

Matches

27 March: Australia v West Indies 

Australia were put in to bat by Brian Lara as the ball moved about and deviated off the seam in the early overs. Daren Powell got the wicket of Adam Gilchrist with an inside edge, while Matthew Hayden could not score off his first 17 deliveries – then made 158 runs from the next 126 to make the highest innings for Australia in a World Cup match. However, Ricky Ponting and Hayden scored at above six an over in their partnership, before Ponting was eventually run out. Hayden added 98 for the third wicket with Michael Clarke before Dwayne Bravo broke through, and Andrew Symonds and Michael Hussey could not provide more than 15 runs to the team cause. Hussey got out the total at 234 for five in the 41st over, but Hayden eventually led Australia to break loose in the last 10 overs, taking 99 from them despite a 20-minute break for rain. Shane Watson's 33 from 26 balls also helped push Australia to 322 for 6 after the full 50 overs. This was the sixth successive score above 300 for Australia, a new One Day International record.

Drizzle and wet ground conditions delayed the start of West Indies' reply and the game was eventually abandoned to resume the following day. They lost three wickets in the first 20 overs, and though Brian Lara and Denesh Ramdin contributed fifties, they required 105 to win off 28 balls when Daren Powell was bowled by Shaun Tait. Earlier, Glenn McGrath had removed Chris Gayle, Marlon Samuels and Dwayne Bravo for single-figure scores, thus moving within one wicket of Wasim Akram's World Cup record.

This was the first international match at the new Sir Vivian Richards Stadium. The stadium was barely half-filled for the game, causing criticism from notables such as West Indies' captain Brian Lara and commentator Mark Nicholas.

28 March: Sri Lanka v South Africa 

Sri Lanka won the toss and elected to bat, and lost their first five wickets for 98, with Charl Langeveldt taking two in his first spell. Tillakaratne Dilshan and Russel Arnold built a sixth-wicket stand of 97 in nearly 20 overs, but Dilshan was caught off Makhaya Ntini's bowling, and then Charl Langeveldt took three wickets in five balls as Sri Lanka were bowled out in the final over for 209. In reply, Chaminda Vaas had AB de Villiers bowled in the first over, but Jacques Kallis added 95 with Graeme Smith and 65 with Herschelle Gibbs, leading South Africa to within four runs of victory with his 86. Then Sri Lanka's Lasith Malinga struck. He became the first bowler to take four wickets with four consecutive deliveries in international cricket, though South Africa managed a run off Vaas in the intermediate over. South Africa now needed three runs to win with one wicket in hand, and eleven deliveries went by before Robin Peterson got an outside edge to a Malinga ball, which went out of reach of slip and went fine for four.

29 March: West Indies v New Zealand

30 March: England v Ireland 

England won the toss and batted first, but lost both openers to Boyd Rankin in six overs, before Ian Bell spent 74 balls making his 31. When Bell got out, the run rate was slightly above 4; in the final 28 overs it was in excess of 6, with Paul Collingwood making 90, Kevin Pietersen 48 and Andrew Flintoff 43. Kyle McCallan was the most economical bowler for Ireland, and also took the wicket of Pietersen.

Chasing 267 in reply, Niall O'Brien's third One Day International fifty and his second of the World Cup helped Ireland to a total of 139 for six in the 37th over, but despite faster than a run a ball scores from Trent Johnston and Andrew White Ireland fell 48 runs short as Andrew Flintoff took the final two wickets, though they exceeded their previous World Cup record total by seven runs.

31 March: Bangladesh v Australia 

Glenn McGrath's three wickets took his tally for the tournament to 56.

1 April: Sri Lanka v West Indies 

The start of the match was delayed due to bad weather, but a full 50-over match was played, which resulted in West Indies' third defeat in four days. Sanath Jayasuriya and Mahela Jayawardene added 183 for the third wicket, before Tillakaratne Dilshan came in and took 39 off 22 deliveries as the final eleven overs yielded 84 runs. In reply, West Indies needed 170 off 94 when Ramnaresh Sarwan was stumped off Sanath Jayasuriya; they only got 56 of those, and were bowled out for 190, with four batsmen out in single figures.

2 April: Bangladesh v New Zealand

3 April: Ireland v South Africa

4 April: Sri Lanka v England 

Sri Lanka batted first and made 235, bowled out off the last ball with a run out. England lost their openers for 0 and 10, but Ian Bell and Kevin Pietersen made a stand of 90 for the third wicket, and Paul Collingwood joined Pietersen to add a further 25 before Pietersen was caught and bowled by Muttiah Muralitharan. England then lost two more wickets for seven runs to Dilhara Fernando, and required 103 off 16.3 overs with four wickets in hand. However, Ravi Bopara scored a half-century in his fourth One Day International innings, as he and Paul Nixon took England within three runs of victory. However, Fernando returned for the last over, and bowled Bopara off the last ball.

7 April: Bangladesh v South Africa

8 April: England v Australia

9 April: New Zealand v Ireland

10 April: South Africa v West Indies

11 April: Bangladesh v England

12 April: New Zealand v Sri Lanka 

Despite missing top bowler Lasith Malinga due to injury, Sri Lanka won comfortably against New Zealand.

13 April: Ireland v Australia 

Australia's win confirmed their place in the top four. Ireland could not now qualify for the semi-finals.

14 April: South Africa v New Zealand

This win by New Zealand meant that they had qualified for the semi-finals. It also confirmed Sri Lanka's place in the top four, as only one other team below them could equal Sri Lanka's 8 points.

15 April: Ireland v Bangladesh 

Ireland's total of 243/7 was their highest in World Cup matches. Bangladesh's loss meant that they could no longer qualify for the semi-finals.

16 April: Sri Lanka v Australia 

Australia were now guaranteed either first or second place in the Super 8s, and Sri Lanka could no longer get first place.

17 April: England v South Africa 

This result confirmed that South Africa had clinched one of the four semi-final places, and that England and the West Indies were unable to progress.

18 April: Ireland v Sri Lanka

19 April: West Indies v Bangladesh

47th Match: Australia v New Zealand, 20 April

Australia secured top place on the Super 8 table and a semi-final match-up with South Africa.

48th Match: West Indies v England, 21 April

References

Super Eights